Songlines are paths crossing the countryside in Australian mythology  

Songlines or songline may also refer to:

The Songlines, a 1987 book by Bruce Chatwin
Songlines (magazine), a music magazine
"Songline", a track on the album Dreamtime Return by Steve Roach
Songlines (Karan Casey album), 1997
Songlines (Peter Brötzmann, Fred Hopkins, and Rashied Ali album), 1994
Songlines (The Derek Trucks Band album), 2006
Songlines Live, a 2006 DVD by the Derek Trucks Band
Songlines (Alphaville video), a collection of short films by the band Alphaville
Songlines, a film by Godfrey Reggio
 Songlines, a Canadian record label established in 1992, producing modern and avant jazz and contemporary world music
Songline (horse), a Japanese racehorse